Serge Moscovici (June 14, 1925 in Brăila, Romania as Srul Herş Moscovici –  November 15, 2014 in Paris) was a Romanian-born French social psychologist, director of the Laboratoire Européen de Psychologie Sociale ("European Laboratory of Social Psychology"), which he co-founded in 1974 at the Maison des sciences de l'homme in Paris. He was a member of the European Academy of Sciences and Arts and Officer of the Légion d'honneur, as well as a member of the Russian Academy of Sciences and honorary member of the Hungarian Academy of Sciences. Moscovici's son, Pierre Moscovici, was European Commissioner for Economic and Financial Affairs, Taxation and Customs.

Biography
Born in Brăila to parents who were grain merchants, His uncle was Ilie Moscovici, a leading Romanian socialist.  Moscovici frequently relocated, together with his father, spending time in Cahul, Galaţi, and Bucharest. (Later he would indicate that his stay in Basarabia had contributed to his image of a homeland.) From an early age Moscovici suffered the effects of anti-semitic discrimination: in 1938, he was expelled from a Bucharest high school on the basis of newly-issued anti-semitic legislation. In later years he commented on the impact of the Iron Guard, and expressed criticism for intellectuals associated with it (Emil Cioran and Mircea Eliade).

Moscovici trained as a mechanic at the Bucharest vocational school Ciocanul. Faced with an ideological choice between Zionism and communism, he opted for the latter, and, in 1939, joined the then-illegal Romanian Communist Party, being introduced by a clandestine activist whom he knew by the pseudonym Kappa.
 
During World War II Moscovici witnessed the Iron Guard-instigated Bucharest Pogrom in January 1941. Later the Ion Antonescu régime interned him in a forced-labor camp, where, together with other persons of his age, he worked on construction teams until freed by the Soviet Red Army in 1944. During those years he taught himself French and educated himself by reading philosophical works (including those of Baruch Spinoza and René Descartes).

Subsequently, Moscovici travelled extensively, notably visiting Palestine, Germany and Austria. During the late stages of World War II he met Isidore Isou, the founder of lettrism, with whom he founded the artistic and literary review Da towards the end of 1944 (Da was quickly censored). Refusing promotion on the basis of political affiliation at a time when the Communist Party participated in Romania's governments, he became instead a welder in the large Bucharest factory owned by Nicolae Malaxa.

Initially welcoming Soviet occupation, Moscovici grew increasingly disillusioned with communist politics, and noted the incidence of anti-Semitism among Red Army soldiers. As the communist regime was taking over and the Cold War started, he helped Zionist dissidents cross the border illegally. For this, he was involved in a 1947 trial held in Timișoara, and decided to leave Romania definitively. Choosing clandestine immigration, he arrived in France a year later, having passed through Hungary and Austria, and having spent time in a refugee camp in Italy.

In Paris, helped by a refugee fund, he studied psychology at the Sorbonne while employed by an industrial enterprise. In reference to himself, Celan, and Moscovici, Chiva later recalled: "For us, people on the Left, but who had fled communism, the first period in Paris, in a capital where the intellectual environments were developing under full-scale Stalinist enthusiasm, was very harsh. We were caught between a rock and a hard place: on one side, the French university environment who saw us as «fascists». [...] On the other, the Romanian exiles, most of all the nationalist students, when not outright on the far right, who did not shy away from denouncing us as communist «moles» in the pay of Bucharest or Moscow."

In 1955, he married Marie Bromberg who he met at the Institute de Psychologie.  They had two sons, Pierre and Denis.

In 1961, he completed His doctoral thesis (La psychanalyse, son image et son public). It was directed by the psychoanalyst Daniel Lagache and explored the social representations of psychoanalysis in France. Moscovici also studied epistemology and history of sciences with philosopher Alexandre Koyré.

During the 1960s Princeton University's Institute for Advanced Study invited him to the United States; he worked at Stanford University and at Yale before returning to Paris to teach at the École pratique des hautes études. He served as a visiting professor at the New School in New York City, at the Rousseau Institute in Geneva, as well as at the Université catholique de Louvain and at the University of Cambridge.

By 1968, together with Brice Lalonde and others, he became involved in green politics, and ran in elections for the office of Mayor of Paris for what later became Les Verts.

He died in Paris in 2014.

Research
His research focus was on group psychology and he began his career by investigating the way knowledge is reformulated as groups take hold of it, distorting it from its original form. His theory of social representations is now widespread in understanding this process of cultural  Chinese whispers. Influenced by Gabriel Tarde, he later criticized American research into majority influence (conformity) and instead investigated the effects of minority influence, where the opinions of a small group influence those of a larger one. He also researched the dynamics of group decisions and consensus-forming.

Social representations

Moscovici developed the theory of social representations which he defined as: "a system of values, ideas and practices with a twofold function: first to establish an order which will enable individuals to orient themselves in their material and social world and to master it; and secondly to enable communication to take place among the members of a community by providing them with a code for social exchange and a code for naming and classifying unambiguously the various aspects of their world and their individual and group history".

Minority influence

Moscovici claimed that majority influence in many ways was misleading – if the majority was indeed all-powerful, we would all end up thinking the same. Drawing attention to the works of Gabriel Tarde, he pointed to the fact that most major social movements have been started by individuals and small groups (e.g. Christianity, Buddhism, the Suffragette movement, Nazism, etc.) and that without an outspoken minority, we would have no innovation or social change.

The study he is most famous for, Influences of a consistent minority on the responses of a majority in a colour perception task, is now seen as one of the defining investigations into the effects of minority influence:
Aims: To investigate the process of innovation by looking at how a consistent minority affect the opinions of a larger group, possibly creating doubt and leading them to question and alter their views
Procedures: Participants were first given an eye test to check that they were not colour blind. They were then placed in a group of four participants and two confederates. they were all shown 36 slides that were different shades of blue and asked to state the colour out loud. There were two groups in the experiment. In the first group the confederates were consistent and answered green for every slide. In the second group the confederates were inconsistent and answered green 24 times and blue 12 times.
Findings: For 8.42% of the trials, participants agreed with the minority and said that the slides were green. Overall, 32% of the participants agreed at least once.
Conclusions: The study suggested that minorities can indeed exert an effect over the opinion of a majority. Not to the same degree as majority influence, but the fact that almost a third of people agreed at least once is significant. However, this also leaves two thirds who never agreed. In a follow up experiment, Moscovici demonstrated that consistency was the key factor in minority influence; by instructing the stooges to be inconsistent, the effect fell off sharply.

Works

Social psychology
 La psychanalyse, son image et son public, PUF, 1961/ new edition 1976 / Psychoanalysis. Its image, its public, Polity Press, 2008
 Reconversion industrielle et changements sociaux. Un exemple: la chapellerie dans l'Aude, Armand Colin, 1961
 L’expérience du mouvement. Jean-Baptiste Baliani, disciple et critique de Galilée, Éditions Hermann, 1967
 Essai sur l’histoire humaine de la nature, Groupe Flammarion, 1968/1977
 La société contre nature, UGE-Seuil, 1972 / Society against nature: the emergence of human societies. Hassocks, Harvester Press - Atlantic Highlands, N.J., Humanities Press, 1976
 Hommes domestiques et hommes sauvages, Union Générale d’éditions, 1974
 Social influence and social change, Academic Press, 1976
 Psychologie des minorités actives, Presses Universitaires de France, 1979
 L'Age des foules: un traité historique de psychologie des masses, Fayard, 1981 / The age of the crowd: a historical treatise on mass psychology. Cambridge, Cambridge University Press, 1985
 Changing conceptions of conspiracy (with C.F. Graumann), New York: Springer, 1987
 La Machine à faire les dieux, Fayard, 1988 / The invention of society: psychological explanations for social phenomena, Cambridge, Polity Press, 1993
 Conflict and Consensus: General Theory of Collective Decisions (with Willem Doise; trans W.D.Hall) SAGE Publications, 1994
 Social Representations: Explorations in Social Psychology (edited by Gerard Duveen), Polity Press, 2000
 The Making of Modern Social Psychology: The Hidden Story of How an International Social Science was Created (with Ivana Markova). Polity Press, 2006.
 Raison et cultures (edited by Nikos Kalampalikis). Editions de l'EHESS, 2012
 Le scandale de la pensée sociale (edited by Nikos Kalampalikis). Editions de l'EHESS, 2013

Ecology
 De la Nature. Pour penser l'écologie, Métailié, 2002
 Réenchanter la nature (Interviews with Pascal Dibie), Aube, 2002

Autobiographies
 Chronique des années égarées: récit autobiographique, Stock, 1997 / Cronica anilor risipiţi Romanian, Polirom, 1999
 Mon après-guerre à Paris: Chronique des années retrouvées (Texte établi, présenté et annoté par Alexandra Laignel-Lavastine) Grasset, 2019

Honours and legacy

Honorary degrees
 University of Geneva
 University of Glasgow
 University of Sussex
 University of Seville
 University of Brussels
 University of Bologna
 University of London
 University of Rome
 University of Mexico
 University of Pecs
 University of Lisbon
 Jönköping University
 University of Iasi (rejected)
 University of Brasilia
 University of Buenos Aires
 University of Evora

International awards
 1980 - In Media Res Prize of the Burda Foundation
 1988 - European Amalfi Prize for Sociology and Social Sciences for La Machine à faire les dieux
 2000 - Ecologia Award
 2003 - Balzan Prize
 2007 - Wilhelm Wundt-William James Award by the American Psychological Foundation and the European Federation of Psychologists' Associations
 2010 - Premio Nonino Master of His Time

Prizes
In commemoration of his elaborate and significant contribution to the world of psychology and society in general, several awards, medals, lectures have been established. Notable among these are:
 Serge Moscovici Medal awarded by the European Association of Social Psychology (EASP)
 "Serge Moscovici" Values-Based Leadership Award by the Aspen Institute Romania.

Network
A network has been established to continue his work:
 Réseau Mondial Serge Moscovici

Further reading
 Bonnes, M. (ed.), Moscovici, La Vita, il percorso intellettuale, i temi, le opere, Milano, FrancoAngeli, 1999.
 Fabrice Buschini, Nikos Kalampalikis (eds.), Penser la vie, le social, la nature. Mélanges en l'honneur de Serge Moscovici, Paris, Editions de la Maison des sciences de l'homme, 2001.
 Kalampaliki, N., Jodelet, D., Wieviorka, Moscovici, D., & Moscovici, P. (eds.). Serge Moscovici. Un regard sur les mondes communs, Paris: Editions de la Maison des sciences de l'homme, 2019.
 Papastamou, S., & Moliner, P. (eds.), Serge Moscovici's work. Legacy and perspective, Paris: Editions des archives contemporaines, 2021.

External links
 European Laboratory of Social Psychology website

See also

References

1925 births
2014 deaths
Romanian Jews
Romanian magazine editors
Romanian magazine founders
French memoirists
French political writers
French psychologists
People from Brăila
Political philosophers
Romanian communists
Romanian emigrants to France
French people of Romanian-Jewish descent
Social psychologists
University of Paris alumni
Academic staff of the University of Paris
Foreign Members of the Russian Academy of Education
Officiers of the Légion d'honneur
The Greens (France) politicians
French sociologists
Members of the European Academy of Sciences and Arts
French male writers
Forced labourers under German rule during World War II